The canton of Pays de Bidache, Amikuze et Ostibarre is an administrative division of the Pyrénées-Atlantiques department, southwestern France. It was created at the French canton reorganisation which came into effect in March 2015. Its seat is in Saint-Palais.

It consists of the following communes:
 
Aïcirits-Camou-Suhast
Amendeuix-Oneix
Amorots-Succos
Arancou
Arbérats-Sillègue
Arbouet-Sussaute
Arhansus
Armendarits
Aroue-Ithorots-Olhaïby
Arraute-Charritte
Ayherre
La Bastide-Clairence
Béguios
Béhasque-Lapiste
Bergouey-Viellenave
Beyrie-sur-Joyeuse
Bidache
Bonloc
Bunus
Came
Domezain-Berraute
Etcharry
Gabat
Garris
Hélette
Hosta
Ibarrolle
Iholdy
Ilharre
Irissarry
Isturits
Juxue
Labets-Biscay
Lantabat
Larceveau-Arros-Cibits
Larribar-Sorhapuru
Lohitzun-Oyhercq
Luxe-Sumberraute
Masparraute
Méharin
Mendionde
Orègue
Orsanco
Osserain-Rivareyte
Ostabat-Asme
Pagolle
Saint-Esteben
Saint-Just-Ibarre
Saint-Martin-d'Arberoue
Saint-Palais
Suhescun
Uhart-Mixe

References

Cantons of Pyrénées-Atlantiques